Blazice is a municipality and village in Kroměříž District in the Zlín Region of the Czech Republic. It has about 200 inhabitants.

History
The first written mention of Blazice is from 1358.

References

External links

 

Villages in Kroměříž District